AAFN may refer to:

 Ardoch Algonquin First Nation, Algonquin community north of Kingston, Ontario
 "Association of Alumni and Friends of NACURH", see National Association of College and University Residence Halls#The Advancement Society